The following television stations broadcast on digital channel 25 in Mexico:

 XHAPN-TDT in Apatzingán, Michoacán
 XHAQR-TDT in Cancún, Quintana Roo 
 XHAW-TDT in Monterrey, Nuevo León
 XHBR-TDT in Nuevo Laredo, Tamaulipas
 XHBS-TDT in Los Mochis, Sinaloa 
 XHCAN-TDT in Cananea, Sonora 
 XHCHI-TDT in Chihuahua, Chihuahua
 XHCTCP-TDT in Chilpancingo, Guerrero
 XHCTTA-TDT in Tampico, Tamaulipas
 XHCTVE-TDT in Veracruz, Veracruz
 XHCVO-TDT in Calvillo, Aguascalientes
 XHDF-TDT in Mexico City
 XHEXT-TDT in Mexicali, Baja California
 XHGCO-TDT in Comonfort, Guanajuato
 XHGJ-TDT in Puerto Vallarta, Jalisco 
 XHGJG-TDT in Guadalajara, Jalisco 
 XHGLP-TDT in San Luis de La Paz, Guanajuato
 XHGTA-TDT in Tarimoro, Guanajuato
 XHHE-TDT in Ciudad Acuña, Coahuila
 XHHPC-TDT in Hidalgo del Parral, Chihuahua 
 XHIG-TDT in Matías Romero, Oaxaca 
 XHIXZ-TDT in Zihuatanejo, Guerrero 
 XHLBU-TDT in La Barca, Jalisco
 XHLEG-TDT in León, Guanajuato
 XHMCH-TDT in Motozintla, Chiapas
 XHOW-TDT in Mazatlán, Sinaloa 
 XHPBC-TDT in La Paz, Baja California Sur
 XHPUM-TDT in Puruándiro, Michoacán
 XHPVC-TDT in Felipe Carrillo Puerto, Quintana Roo
 XHSFT-TDT in San Fernando, Tamaulipas 
 XHSPC-TDT in San Pedro, Durango
 XHSPJ-TDT in Chetumal, Quintana Roo
 XHSPRVT-TDT in Villahermosa, Tabasco
 XHTLZ-TDT in Tlaltenango, Zacatecas
 XHTMCC-TDT in Ciudad del Carmen, Campeche
 XHVTU-TDT in Ciudad Victoria, Tamaulipas 
 XHY-TDT in Mérida, Yucatán 
 XHZAM-TDT in Zamora, Michoacán
 XHZMM-TDT in Zitácuaro, Michoacán

25